Love Lies Bleeding is a 1999 drama film directed by William Tannen.

Plot summary 
Jack the Ripper terrorizes London in 1888. The young talented journalist Catherine Winwood (Emily Raymound) begins her first job. The relationship between Catherine and the surgeon Jonathan Stevens (Paul Rhys) threatens to shatter, as her fiancé may be involved in the gruesome murderer of young prostitutes in the Whitechapel district.  But Inspector Frederick Abberline (Wayne Rogers) arrests another suspected surgeon ...

Cast 
 Paul Rhys as Jonathan
 Emily Raymond as Catherine Winwood
 Malcolm McDowell as Malcolm Mead
 Wayne Rogers as Inspector Abberline
 Faye Dunaway as Josephine Butler
 Noel le Bon as Emmett-Lloyd
 John Comer as Constable Neal 
rest of cast listed alphabetically
 Peter Alton as Drunken Sailor 
 Kevin Barron as Bunter 
 Alice Bendová as Elisabeth Stride (as Alice Veselá) 
 Nancy Bishop as Polly 
 Paul Bowers as Photographer 
 Colleen Case as Passer By 
 Michael Cella as Barkeeper 
 Barbara Day as Charlotte 
 Christian Dunckley Clark as Masonry Worker 
 David Fisher as Coroner Baxter 
 Monika Foris Kvasnicková as Madam (as Monika Kvasnicková) 
 Simon Francis as Stead 
 Simon French as Brown 
 Tim Gosling as Bobby 1 
 Michaela Hans as Annie Chapman 
 Vashti Hughes as Tart 
 Janet Lynch as Trudy 
 Hugh McGahan as Prof. Coweling 
 Caroline Medows as Maggie 
 Andrea Miltner as Mary Kelly (as Andrea Miltnerova) 
 Frank Navratil as Intern 2 
 Jan Nemejovský as Monroe
 David Nykl as Fraser 
 Robert Orr as George Lusk 
 Rudolf Pellar as Thornton 
 Jakob Schwarz as Bremner 
 Robert Seymour as McKenzie 
 Kate Simpson as Mrs. Cooper 
 Bruce Solomon as Intern 1 
 Elin Spidlová as Kathy Eddows 
 Gordon Stone as Quinn 
 Nick Stuart as Cross 
 Pavel Vokoun as Shoemaker Pizer 
 Collin Williams as Crowd Member 
 Garry Wright as Clerk 
 Jennifer Yeager as Nurse Ellis 
 Laura Zam as Demonstrator

Production 
Love Lies Bleeding was the last small budget film produced by the Village Roadshow Pictures before it was bought out by Warner Brothers. The script was written by Tony Rush, Richard Rush's son, and was co-produced by Wally Lake and Ricardo Freixa. The film was an Australian–American co-production.

Home media 
The film was released in 2000 respectively in 2006 (German language) on DVD.

External links 
 

1999 films
American crime drama films
1999 crime films
Films about Jack the Ripper
Australian crime drama films
Village Roadshow Pictures films
Films shot in Australia
Films set in London
Films set in 1888
Films directed by William Tannen (director)
1990s English-language films
1990s American films
1990s Australian films